Jan Feith (12 May 1874 – 2 September 1944) was a Dutch writer. His work was part of the literature event in the art competition at the 1932 Summer Olympics. In his younger years he was an accomplished sportsman. He celebrated a some minor victories in cycling and speed skating, sports in which his friend Jaap Eden was the champion of his age.

References

1874 births
1944 deaths
20th-century Dutch male writers
Olympic competitors in art competitions
Writers from Amsterdam
Dutch male cyclists
Dutch male speed skaters